Villanova station is a SEPTA Regional Rail station on the campus of Villanova University in Villanova, Pennsylvania. It is in Radnor Township, located on North Spring Mill Road (PA 320) near County Line Road and serves most Paoli/Thorndale Line trains.

The station building was originally built in 1890 by the Pennsylvania Railroad and is within the campus of Villanova University. The eastbound and westbound platforms are ground-level and are connected by an underground handicap accessible pedestrian tunnel running beneath the tracks (which replaced the old non-handicapped accessible tunnel in 2018) The station building is also home to a small café called "Rosie's Coffee". There are 167 parking spaces at the station, including SEPTA permit parking. This station is 12.0 track miles from Philadelphia's Suburban Station. In 2017, the average total weekday boardings at this station was 466, and the average total weekday alightings was 447.

Station layout
Villanova has two low-level side platforms with pathways connecting the platforms to the inner tracks.

References

External links
SEPTA - Villanova Station
 North Spring Mill Road entrance from Google Maps Street View

SEPTA Regional Rail stations
Former Pennsylvania Railroad stations
Philadelphia to Harrisburg Main Line
Radnor Township, Delaware County, Pennsylvania
Railway stations in the United States opened in 1890
Railway stations in Delaware County, Pennsylvania
Railway stations in Pennsylvania at university and college campuses